Inex is an eclipse cycle.

Inex or INEX may refer to:
 Inex Pharmaceuticals
 Inex Adria Airways
 Internet Neutral Exchange, Ireland
 The Legends car racing rules body